= USC Men's Basketball =

USC men's basketball may refer to:

- South Carolina Gamecocks men's basketball, the collegiate men's basketball program of the University of South Carolina (often referred to as "SC" or "USC" in athletics)
- USC Trojans men's basketball, the collegiate men's basketball program of the University of Southern California
